The 1927 Northern Arizona Lumberjacks football team was an American football team that represented Northern Arizona Teachers College (now known as Northern Arizona University) as an independent during the 1927 college football season. The Lumberjacks compiled a 6–1–2 record, shut out eight of nine opponents, and outscored all opponents by a total of 208 to 24.

Rudy Lavik was the team's head coach. He was assisted by Edward Voltmer. The team played its home games at McMullen Field in Flagstaff, Arizona.

Schedule

References

Arizona State–Flagstaff
Northern Arizona Lumberjacks football seasons
Arizona State–Flagstaff Lumberjacks football